The Broadband Forum is a non-profit industry consortium dedicated to developing broadband network specifications. Members include telecommunications networking and service provider companies, broadband device and equipment vendors, consultants and independent testing labs (ITLs).  Service provider members are primarily wire-line service providers (non-mobile) telephone companies.

History
The DSL Forum was founded in 1994 with about 200 member companies in different divisions of the telecommunication and information technology sector.  It is used as a platform for companies that operate in the broadband market.  Its initial main purpose was the establishment of new standards around digital subscriber line communication products such as provisioning. This cooperation has brought different standardizations for ADSL, SHDSL, VDSL, ADSL2+ and VDSL2. 

The group  was established in 1994 as the ADSL Forum, but became the DSL Forum in 1999.  It was renamed after the digital subscriber line (DSL) family of technology, also known collectively as xDSL.

Among its early design documents, the Forum created TR-001 (1996) system reference model, which together with later TR-012 (1999) core network architecture, recommended PPP over an ATM transport layer as the best practice for a DSL ISP. This was subsequently refined in TR-025 and TR-059. 

Starting in 2004, the Forum expanded its work into other last mile technologies including optical fiber.  On 17 June 2008 it changed its name to "Broadband Forum". DSL-related specifications, while still a key part of the forum's work, are no longer its only work. For instance, the forum produced work specific to passive optical networking (PON). Its Auto-Configuration Server specification TR-069, originally published in 2004, was adapted for use with set-top box and Network Attached Storage units.

The Forum's TR-101 specification (2006) documents migration toward an Ethernet-based DSL aggregation model (Ethernet DSLAMs).

In May 2009, IP/MPLS Forum merged with the Broadband Forum. It had promoted the Frame Relay and Multiprotocol Label Switching technologies.
Technical work of IP/MPLS Forum continued in a newly created "IP/MPLS and Core" Working Group of the Broadband Forum. The historical specifications from the IP/MPLS Forum's predecessors, ATM Forum, Frame Relay Forum, MFA Forum, and MPLS Forum, are archived on the Broadband Forum's website, under IP/MPLS Forum specifications.

Broadband Forum issued Femto Access Point Service Data Model TR-196 during April 2009 and version 2 released during November 2011.

Broadband Forum specified in TR-348  for Hybrid Access Networks an architecture that enables network operators to efficiently combine XDSL and LTE.

See also
TR-069
TR-196

References

External links
 
 Advantages Of Leased Lines Over Broadband

Technology consortia
Digital subscriber line
Broadband
Digital television